In music, Op. 89 stands for Opus number 89. Compositions that are assigned this number include:

 Beethoven – Polonaise, Op. 89
 Brahms – Gesang der Parzen
 Dvořák – Requiem
 Fauré – Piano Quintet No. 1
 Hummel – Piano Concerto No. 3
 Schubert – Winterreise
 Schumann – 6 Gesänge
 Shostakovich – The Unforgettable Year 1919